Georgia-Palestinian relations refers to relations between Georgia and the State of Palestine.

History 
Since 25 April 1992, Georgia has recognized the state of Palestine, which was proclaimed in 1988, and the two nations enjoy diplomatic ties.

The Georgian government did not participate in the UNESCO vote on Palestine's admission. Georgia voted in support of giving Palestine UN non-member observer status. "Georgia is geographically adjacent to the Middle East and supports the creation of the State of Palestine", Tbilisi stated when explaining the nation's position in the General Assembly.

See also 
 Foreign relations of Georgia
 Foreign relations of Palestine
 Monastery of the Cross

References 

Bilateral relations of the State of Palestine
Palestine